Pain Hashtal (also Romanized as Pā’īn Hashtal; also known as Hashtal and Hashtal-e Pā’īn) is a village in Dabuy-ye Jonubi Rural District, Dabudasht District, Amol County, Mazandaran Province, Iran. At the 2006 census, its population was 829, in 209 families.

References 

Populated places in Amol County